The How To Destroy the Universe festival is a California music event that presents experimental noise, industrial sounds, and avant-garde visual art. Founded in 2002 by Berkeley, California Ethan Port and Scot Jenerik and the San Francisco-based experimental music label Mobilization Records, the festival aimed to expand the parameters of what is termed "art" and "culture." The bands who played during the event focused on "exploding conventions around song structure, melody and rhythm and then reassembling the parts." The 2002-2005 tours had included fire-art, multimedia performances and throat singing. Bands who played in 2006 include Blixa Bargeld of Einstürzende Neubauten, the Living Jarboe of the Swans, F-Space, and Sixteens. In 2010, a four day How to Destroy the Universe festival took place in the San Francisco Bay Area to celebrate what turned out to be the final Throbbing Gristle performances in the United States. 

Although occasional, the festival series is still active.

See also
List of experimental music festivals
Live electronic music

References

External links
festival website

Music festivals in California
Experimental music festivals
Culture of Berkeley, California
Festivals in the San Francisco Bay Area
Music of the San Francisco Bay Area
2002 establishments in California
2006 disestablishments in California
Electronic music festivals in the United States